The 1915 municipal election was held December 13, 1915 to elect a mayor and five aldermen to sit on Edmonton City Council and four trustees to sit on each of the public and separate school boards.

There were ten aldermen on city council, but five of the positions were already filled: Hugh Calder, R N Frith, Joseph Henri Picard, James Ramsey, and Samuel Williamson were all elected to two-year terms in 1914 and were still in office.

There were seven trustees on the public school board, but three of the positions were already filled: Charles Gibbs, J J McKenzie, and William Rea had been elected to two-year terms in 1914.  The same was true of the separate board, where A H Esch, Joseph Gariépy, and M J O'Farrell were continuing.

Electoral System
The election of mayor was conducted by First past the post.

The election of aldermen was conducted through Plurality block voting, with each voter having ability to cast as many as six votes, no more than one per candidate.

Voter turnout

There were 7235 ballots cast out of 17990 eligible voters, for a voter turnout of 40.2%.

Results

 bold indicates elected
 italics indicate incumbent
 Data for 1915 is unavailable regarding South Side representatives, instituted after the city of Strathcona, south of the North Saskatchewan River, amalgamated into Edmonton on February 1, 1912.

Mayor

William Thomas Henry was acclaimed for a second term as mayor.

Aldermen

Robert Douglas - 5,488
James Macfie MacDonald - 3,504
Orlando Bush - 3,339
Charles Wilson - 3,300
William Campbell McArthur - 2,933
James Kinney - 2,857
C C Tatham - 2,428
Joseph Clarke - 1,633
Joseph Driscoll - 1,523
Rice Sheppard - 1,379
H H Hull - 1,359
Joseph Adair - 1,146
Adevdat Boileau - 872
Frederick C. Humberstone - 461

Public school trustees

Walter Ramsey - 4180
Samuel Barnes - 3942
Henry Douglas - 3261
J A McPherson - 3200
W A Lewis - 2124
J S Wright - 2010
Avery Smith - 1353
Amy Keane - 601
Marion Seymour - 591

Separate (Catholic) school trustees

Joseph Henri Picard - 444
I. Tremblay - 404
Joseph O'Neill - 389
M. J. Kelly - 359

Referendum
Following the election, city burgesses (property-owners) were asked if they endorsed the city operating the power plant or whether it should go into private hands.
about 7000 voted in favour of privatization, 5000 against.
As by-law did not receive two-thirds support, the city maintained its power plant. 
The City created a city-owned corporation, "EPCOR", in 1996.

References

Election History, City of Edmonton: Elections and Census Office

1915
1915 elections in Canada
1915 in Alberta